Falle is a surname. Notable people with the surname include:

Bertram Falle, 1st Baron Portsea (1859-1948), British politician
Natasha Falle (born 1974), Canadian human rights activist
Philip Falle (1656-1742), English historian
Philip Falle (sailor) (1885-1936), British Olympian
Sir Sam Falle (1919-2014), British diplomat